Altererythrobacter ishigakiensis  is a Gram-negative, non-spore-forming, halophilic and non-motile bacterium from the genus of Altererythrobacter which has been isolated from the coastal area of Okinawa on Japan. Altererythrobacter ishigakiensis produces astaxanthin.

References 

Sphingomonadales
Bacteria described in 2011
Halophiles